A barn (symbol: b) is a metric unit of area equal to  (100 fm2). Originally used in nuclear physics for expressing the cross sectional area of nuclei and nuclear reactions, today it is also used in all fields of high-energy physics to express the cross sections of any scattering process, and is best understood as a measure of the probability of interaction between small particles. A barn is approximately the cross-sectional area of a uranium nucleus. The barn is also the unit of area used in nuclear quadrupole resonance and nuclear magnetic resonance to quantify the interaction of a nucleus with an electric field gradient. While the barn never was an SI unit, the SI standards body acknowledged it in the 8th SI Brochure (superseded in 2019) due to its use in particle physics.

Etymology
During Manhattan Project research on the atomic bomb during World War II, American physicists at Purdue University needed a secretive name for a unit with which to quantify the cross-sectional area presented by the typical nucleus (~10−28 m2) and decided on "barn". They considered this a large target for particle accelerators that needed to have direct strikes on nuclei, and the proposers, physicists Marshall Holloway and Richard Baker, said that the constant "for nuclear purposes was really as big as a barn". The American idiom "couldn't hit the broad side of a barn" refers to someone whose aim is very bad. Initially they hoped the name would obscure any reference to the study of nuclear structure; eventually, the word became a standard unit in nuclear and particle physics.

Commonly used prefixed versions
The unit symbol for the barn (b) is also the IEEE standard symbol for bit. In other words, 1 Mb can mean one megabarn or one megabit.

Conversions
Calculated cross sections are often given in terms of inverse squared gigaelectronvolts (GeV-2), via the conversion ħ2c2/GeV2 =  = .

In natural units (where ħ = c = 1), this simplifies to GeV−2 =  = .

SI units with prefix
In SI, one can use units such as square femtometers (fm2). The most common SI prefixed unit for the barn is the femtobarn, which is equal to a tenth of a square zeptometer. Many scientific papers discussing high-energy physics mention quantities of fractions of femtobarn level.

Inverse femtobarn
The inverse femtobarn (fb−1) is the unit typically used to measure the number of particle collision events per femtobarn of target cross-section, and is the conventional unit for time-integrated luminosity. Thus if a detector has accumulated  of integrated luminosity, one expects to find 100 events per femtobarn of cross-section within these data.

Consider a particle accelerator where two streams of particles, with cross-sectional areas measured in femtobarns, are directed to collide over a period of time. The total number of collisions will be directly proportional to the luminosity of the collisions measured over this time. Therefore, the collision count can be calculated by multiplying the integrated luminosity by the sum of the cross-section for those collision processes. This count is then expressed as inverse femtobarns for the time period (e.g., 100 fb−1 in nine months). Inverse femtobarns are often quoted as an indication of particle collider productivity.

Fermilab produced  in the first decade of the 21st century. A record of over 23 fb−1 was achieved during 2012.

Usage example 
As a simplified example, if a beamline runs for 8 hours (28 800 seconds) at an instantaneous luminosity of   , then it will gather data totaling an integrated luminosity of  =  =  during this period. If this is multiplied by the cross-section, then a dimensionless number is obtained equal to the number of expected scattering events.

See also
 "Shake", a unit of time created by the same people at the same time as the barn
Orders of magnitude (area)
List of unusual units of measurement
List of humorous units of measurement

References

External links
IUPAC citation for this usage of "barn"

Units of area
Non-SI metric units
Particle physics